Bellary Thermal Power station is located in Kudatini Village, Bellary District in the Indian state of Karnataka. Two coal-fired units of 500 MW each are in operation with generating capacity of 12 million units per day and a 700 MW coal-fired unit with operation The thermal electric power generating station is run by KPCL a government of Karnataka undertaking. This electric generating plant is located at Kudatini village on Hosapete - Ballari road.

Capacity 
The plant has 3 power generating units involving 1 700MW super-critical boiler technology.

References

External links

 http://www.thehindu.com/todays-paper/tp-national/tp-karnataka/boiler-of-bellary-thermal-power-station-lit-up/article1777892.ece

Coal-fired power stations in Karnataka
Buildings and structures in Bellary district
2007 establishments in Karnataka
Energy infrastructure completed in 2007